The 2000 NHL Entry Draft was the 38th NHL Entry Draft. It was held on June 24 and 25, 2000 at the Pengrowth Saddledome in Calgary, Alberta, following the 2000 NHL Expansion Draft on June 23 for the Columbus Blue Jackets and Minnesota Wild. This was the second NHL Entry Draft in which a goaltender was taken first overall (at that point), when the New York Islanders selected Rick DiPietro with the first overall pick. Previously, Michel Plasse was selected 1st overall in the 1968 NHL Amateur Draft.

The last active players in the NHL from this draft class were Justin Williams, Ron Hainsey, Deryk Engelland and Henrik Lundqvist, who all played their last NHL games in the 2019–20 season.

Selections by round
Club teams are located in North America unless otherwise noted.

Round one

Round two

Round three

Round four

Round five

Round six

Round seven

Round eight

Round nine

Draftees based on nationality

See also
2000 NHL Expansion Draft
2000–01 NHL season
List of NHL first overall draft choices
List of NHL players

References
SLAM! Hockey. NHL Draft 2000.
National Hockey League. 2000 NHL Draft.

External links
 2000 NHL Entry Draft player stats at The Internet Hockey Database
 prosportstransactions.com: 2000 NHL Entry Draft Pick

National Hockey League Entry Draft
Draft